Autódromo Termas de Río Hondo  is a motorsport circuit located in Termas de Río Hondo, Argentina. The circuit was opened in 2008 and underwent a complete overhaul and rebuild process in 2012, based on design by the Italian circuit designer .

Racing background
The circuit hosted the third round of the Grand Prix motorcycle racing season in 2014 and 2015, bringing Grand Prix motorcycle racing back to Argentina after fifteen years. In 2013, the circuit also hosted Rounds 15 and 16 of the FIA WTCC Race of Argentina of the World Touring Car Championship, and the first MotoGP and Moto2 official tests.  The track was to host the Argentine motorcycle Grand Prix in 2013, but the government's nationalisation of the local subsidiary of Repsol S.A., and the ensuing cancellation of gas exports to Argentina raised concerns for the safety of the Honda MotoGP team that is sponsored by the Spanish oil company, forcing a one-year postponement. In previous years, the circuit has also hosted events in the TC2000, Turismo Carretera and Formula Renault series.
On February 6, 2021, the circuit's pit buildings were destroyed due to a fire. No human victims were reported.

Events

 Current
 April: Grand Prix motorcycle racing Argentine motorcycle Grand Prix, TCR South America Touring Car Championship
 May: Turismo Carretera, TC Pista, Ultramaraton Internacional Termas
 July: Turismo Pista
 August—September: Porsche Cup Brasil

 Former

 Formula 4 Sudamericana (2015)
 Porsche GT3 Cup Trophy Argentina (2018)
 TC2000 Championship (2008–2011, 2013–2017, 2022)
 Top Race V6 (2009–2011, 2013–2016)
 Turismo Nacional (2009, 2011, 2013–2019, 2022)
 World Touring Car Championship FIA WTCC Race of Argentina (2013–2017)

Multiple winners

Grand Prix motorcycle racing

Lap records

The fastest official race lap records at the Autódromo Termas de Río Hondo are listed as:

Notes

References

External links 

Autódromo Termas de Río Hondo
Autódromo Termas de Río Hondo
Autódromo Termas de Río Hondo